John Rogers was an overseer of three plantations, including Thomas Jefferson's Monticello. He then owned and operated the East Belmont plantation. Rogers was a co-founder of the Albemarle Agricultural Society, and was known for his revolutionary agricultural reforms. His influence and knowledge-gathering was centered among planters in Albemarle County, as well as across the country and in Europe.

Early years
John Rogers was the son of Mary Trice and Byrd Rogers, who were married in King and Queen County, Virginia. They had two other sons, Philip and Byrd. His father married twice, the second time to Martha Trice, his first wife's sister. Martha Trice and Byrd had the following children: Lewis, Elizabeth, Lucy, Anne, and George. 

Byrd was a lieutenant of the Cincinnati militia and held that rank during the American Revolutionary War. Byrd's siblings were George, Giles, and Ann, who married George Clark and was the mother of George Rogers Clark. John and Byrd descended from Giles Rogers who immigrated from Worcestershire, England to Virginia in the 1690s and settled in King and Queen County, Virginia. They also descended from Englishman John Rogers, the martyr of Smithfield who was burned at the stake in 1555.

Career

Overseer

Rogers was the overseer of the Belmont Plantation for John Harvie. He was also the overseer of Monticello beginning in 1791 and later of Shadwell.

Landowner and farmer

Rogers purchased the Belmont estate in 1807, following the death of John Harvie. He sold about 636 acres of the estate to  Dr. Charles Everett, splitting the property into Belmont Plantation and his portion that was named East Belmont. Around 1811, he built a Federal-style house, which sat on a 1,200-acre plantation. East Belmont had grist and saw mills and a warehouse (which were later destroyed during Sherman's March to the Sea of the American Civil War (1861–1865)).

When he moved onto East Belmont in 1811, most the land was not suitable for cultivation. He developed a scheme for rotating crops of wheat, clover, and corn. In 1828, East Belmont won the first year of the Albemarle Agricultural Society's competition for "the best regulated plantation." He was a slaveholder, whose farm was very profitable. He sold beef and corn to Thomas Jefferson. He produced whiskey, which he may have sold to Jefferson, too.

Agricultural reform
Rogers—along with Jefferson, James Madison, James Monroe, and Robert McCormick—was a founder of the Agricultural Society of Albemarle. Rogers was "in the forefront of the agricultural reform movement" of the early 19th century. He was known for his progressive approaches to agriculture, including methods for improving the quality of the soil after years of tobacco crops. Farm land in the area was also of poor quality due to vertical plowing and infrequent crop rotation. 

In 1842, the Board of Agriculture stated that:

Members were the leading planters in the area who shared ideas and experiences. They relinquished its dependency on tobacco, and began growing new crops, like grain and wheat. The society had a national presence and published the American Farmer.

Rogers communicated with other agricultural societies around the country and in Europe to glean and share information. He established the first agricultural fair in Albemarle County. Prizes were given to farmers and ranchers who engaged in soil conservation, had successful crops and home products, or improved breeds of horses and cattle. He was on several judging committees.

In 1818, Rogers was on a committee to "engage some suitable person to undertake the manufacture of modern agricultural implements". Other committees included erosion control measures, improved fertilizers and new methods of animal husbandry. He was known as "Farmer John", and was said to have the "best tilled farm in the county" by the society.

Personal life
He married Susan Goodman, the daughter of Charles Goodman, and they had four children: John, Thornton, Mary and Janetta. His two daughters married brothers. Mary married Richard Sampson and Janette married John Price Sampson. John Jr., who married a Sampson woman, lived at East Belmont and was a prosperous and influential citizen of the area. Thornton was a Presbyterian minister, who built the South Plains Church. He was the minister of the church until his death. Thornton was given part of East Belmont, where he built the manor called Keswick. He married Margaret Hart.

He died in 1838. Mrs. Rogers married Edward Thurman of Tennessee. Thurman ran the farm ably, using new farm implements, like the reaper.

Notes

References

1838 deaths
Thomas Jefferson
People from Albemarle County, Virginia